Germany participated at both editions of the European Games.

Medal table

See also 
 Germany at the Olympics

References